Surgical Endoscopy is a peer-reviewed medical journal published by Springer Science+Business Media. It is the official journal of the Society of American Gastrointestinal and Endoscopic Surgeons and the European Association for Endoscopic Surgery.

Surgical Endoscopy covers the surgical aspects of interventional endoscopy, ultrasound, and other techniques in gastroenterology, obstetrics, gynecology, and urology. Also, the fields of gastroenterologic, thoracic, traumatic, orthopedic, and pediatric surgery are represented. The journal has a 2016 impact factor of 3.747.

The editors-in-chief are George Hanna (St Mary's Hospital) and Mark Talamini (Stony Brook University). Editors emeriti include Alfred Cuschieri, Kimberly Forde and Bruce MacFadyen Jr.

References

External links
 

Endoscopy
Surgery journals
Springer Science+Business Media academic journals
Monthly journals
English-language journals
Publications established in 1986